Muidhara is a village in Khandaghosh CD block in Bardhaman Sadar South subdivision of Purba Bardhaman district in West Bengal, India.HRITHIK IS THE VILLAGER OF MUIDHARA

Geography
The neighbours of Muidhara are Moiradanga, Uchalan, Induti, Purba Chowk, Gopal Bera, etc. It is approximately halfway between Bardhaman and Arambag cities on State highway 7.

Demographics
As per the 2011 Census of India Muidhara had a total population of 1,376 of which 711 (52%) were males and 665 (48%) were females. Population below 6 years was 139. The total number of literates in Muidhara was 1,051 (84.96% of the population over 6 years).

Education
Techno India, an English-medium school, following the CBSE curriculum, was opened at Muidhara in 2011. Muidhara has a Free Primary School. Student's Academy (Teach by Subhankar Das ph 6294203766)

Culture
Muidhara has its own Library (Muidhara Kishore Sangha Pathagar), Club (Muidhara Kishore Sangha), Upper Primary School, Playground, Masjid, Kali Mandir, Shiv Mandir, Durga Mandir. Kali mandir(Das para), Student's Academy(Educational Coaching Center Teach by Subhankar Das class v to xii) 
Pirer Mela is very familiar in dakshin Damodar and it was organized in every year 1st Magh (Bengali date) in southern part of this village.

References

Villages in Purba Bardhaman district